Fahnbulleh is a surname of Liberian origin.

List of people with the surname 

 Fatima Massaquoi-Fahnbulleh (1912–1978), Liberian educator
 Gamal Fahnbulleh (born 1982), British broadcast journalist and television presenter
 Henry Boimah Fahnbulleh (born 1949), Liberian politician and diplomat
 Joseph Fahnbulleh (born 2001), Liberian sprinter
 Miatta Fahnbulleh (disambiguation), several people

See also 

 Fahn (disambiguation)
 Farnborough (disambiguation)
 Buller (disambiguation)

References 

Surnames
Surnames of African origin